William Neely "Memphis" Mallory (November 20, 1901 – February 13, 1945) was an American football player. He was a significant part of the Yale University teams that went 8–1 in 1921 and 8–0 in 1923. After graduating, he joined the US Army Air Forces as an intelligence officer and led Operation Mallory during World War II, which destroyed 22 of 24 bridges over the Po River, thereby damaging German supply lines into Italy. He died on his way home from the war, when his plane crashed. He was elected to the College Football Hall of Fame in 1964.

Yale University established the William Neely Mallory Award in his memory.

References

External links
 

1901 births
1945 deaths
American football fullbacks
Yale Bulldogs football players
All-American college football players
College Football Hall of Fame inductees
United States Army Air Forces officers
Players of American football from Memphis, Tennessee
United States Army Air Forces personnel killed in World War II
Victims of aviation accidents or incidents in Italy
Victims of aviation accidents or incidents in 1945